The year 2011 was the 230th year of the Rattanakosin Kingdom of Thailand. It was the 66th year in the reign of King Bhumibol Adulyadej (Rama IX), and is reckoned as year 2554 in the Buddhist Era. The year saw the election of Yingluck Shinawatra as prime minister, as well as the worst flooding in the country's history.

Incumbents
King: Bhumibol Adulyadej 
Crown Prince: Vajiralongkorn
Prime Minister: 
 until 5 August: Abhisit Vejjajiva 
 starting 5 August: Yingluck Shinawatra
Supreme Patriarch: Nyanasamvara Suvaddhana

Events

January

February

March

April

May
Thailand's Got Talent (season 1) ended on May 29 with the Results Final.

June

July
2011 Thai general election took place on July 3, 2011. Yingluck Shinawatra became the first female prime minister in the history of Thailand.

August

September

October
2011 PTT Thailand Open ended on October 2. Andy Murray won the singles tournament and Oliver Marach and Aisam-ul-Haq Qureshi won the doubles tournament.

November

December

Births

Deaths

See also
 2011 Thai Premier League
 2011 Thai Division 1 League
 2011 Southern Thailand floods
 2011 in Thai football
 Thailand at the 2011 Southeast Asian Games
 Thailand's Got Talent (season 1)
 2011 in Thai television
 List of Thai films of 2011

References

External links
Year 2011 Calendar - Thailand

 
Years of the 21st century in Thailand
Thailand